George Emrick Harris (January 6, 1827 – March 19, 1911) was a U.S. Representative from Mississippi.

Biography 
Born in Orange County, North Carolina, Harris moved to Tennessee and thence to Mississippi.
He attended the common schools.
He studied law.
He was admitted to the bar in 1854 and practiced.
He entered the Confederate States Army and served as lieutenant colonel until the close of the Civil War.

Harris was elected district attorney in 1865 and reelected in 1866.
Upon the readmission of the State of Mississippi to representation he was elected as a Republican to the Forty-first and Forty-second Congresses and served from February 23, 1870, to March 3, 1873.
He served as the only Republican Attorney General of the State of Mississippi 1873–1877.
Harris was Lieutenant Governor 1877–1879.
He engaged as an author of books on legal subjects.
He died in Washington, D.C., March 19, 1911.
He was interred in Oak Hill Cemetery in Washington, D.C.

He was the first Republican elected to the office of Mississippi Attorney General and only Republican to do so until Lynn Fitch was elected in 2019.

Notes

References

1827 births
1911 deaths
People from Orange County, North Carolina
Republican Party members of the United States House of Representatives from Mississippi
Lieutenant Governors of Mississippi
Mississippi Attorneys General
19th-century American politicians
District attorneys in Mississippi
Mississippi lawyers
Confederate States Army officers
People of Mississippi in the American Civil War
19th-century American lawyers
Burials at Oak Hill Cemetery (Washington, D.C.)